RPM or rpm is a commonly used initialism for revolutions per minute, a measure of rotation frequency.

RPM may also refer to:

Science and technology

 Radiation Portal Monitor, for screening against threats
 Random positioning machine, simulating microgravity
 Raven's Progressive Matrices, a cognitive test
 Rapid plant movement
 Rendezvous pitch maneuver, by a space shuttle
 RPM-30-2-Can Do: Respiration, Pulse (or Perfusion), and Mental status, in START triage 
 Rounds per minute, of a firearm

Computing
 Ranish Partition Manager, software
 RPM Package Manager, Linux software

Medicine
 Remote patient monitoring

Organizations
 RPM International, a chemical sealant company
 RPM (magazine), former Canadian music magazine
 RPM Mortgage, mortgage banking, US
 RPM Records (UK)
 RPM Records (United States)
 Radio Programas de México, Mexican radio company
 Rally for Mali (Rassemblement pour le Mali), a political party in Mali
 RP Motorsport, an Italian auto racing team
 Race Performance Motorsport, an Italian auto racing team

Film and television
 Power Rangers RPM, TV season
 R. P. M., a 1971 drama film
 RPM (Cars), a character in the movie Cars
 RPM (film), 1997
 RPM (TV series), Australian motorsport
 "RPM" (The Batman)

Music
 RPM (American band)
 RPM (Brazilian band)
 "RPM" (Sugar Ray song), in 1998 album Floored
 "RPM" (Sasha Pieterse song), 2013
 "RPM" (Boney James song), from album Ride
 "RPM" (SF9 song), 2019
 Revolutions per Minute (Rise Against album)
 Rock Productions Music, a Christian band

Economics
 Resale price maintenance

Other uses
 RPM (horse)
 RPM (nightclub), a former nightclub in Toronto, Canada
 RPM (wrestler)
 Rapid prompting method, a pseudoscientific technique
 Revenue passenger mile, a measure of passenger traffic
 Ngukurr Airport, IATA airport code